MAPK/MAK/MRK overlapping kinase is an enzyme that in humans is encoded by the RAGE gene.

References

Further reading